The Ikar  was a rocket upper stage designed in Russia in 1999 to be used with the Soyuz 11A511U rocket as Soyuz-Ikar. It was derived from the propulsion module of the Yantar spy satellites.

References 

Expendable space launch systems
Rocket stages
Space launch vehicles of Russia